You Were Never Uglier is a June 2, 1944 comedy short subject motion picture produced by Columbia Pictures and starring Andy Clyde, Emmett Lynn, and Esther Howard.

Plot
Andy and Emmett are two sailors who finally return home to propose to their fiancées. Andy uses a radio to perform his marriage proposal, which his fiancée Nan (Esther Howard) accepts, but soon the two hapless men find out that married life is no piece of cake.

However, when a fire burns down their apartment, they are forced to live in a small home in the suburbs. Andy and Emmett agree to clean the place up, with their new son, Junior, while the wives go shopping for the day, but it's no easy task. Andy has trouble putting a bed together upstairs, and downstairs, Emmett has trouble with a dresser. Emmett eventually brings the dresser upstairs via a movable cart; when he tries to flip it over, it ends up crashing and breaking.

Later, they paint the kitchen, but Junior accidentally dumps out fireplace soot and it soon covers the kitchen. The wives return, outraged. They both plan to knock out Andy and Emmett with boards, but they duck and the women knock themselves out.

They decide to return to their ship that is still in port at the dockyard. But they do not make it in time and they fall into the water.

Credits
Director/Producer: Jules White
Story/Screenplay: Felix Adler
Stars: Andy Clyde, Emmett Lynn, Buz Buckley, Esther Howard, and Judy Malcolm

Remakes
You Were Never Uglier was remade in 1952 as Hooked And Rooked with Margie Liszt and Maxine Gates playing the roles of the fiancées.

References

External links
 

Columbia Pictures short films
1944 films
1940s English-language films
American comedy short films
1944 comedy films
American black-and-white films
1940s American films